Richard James Gerard  (born 20 October 1936) is a former New Zealand politician. He was a National Party Member of Parliament from 1984 to 1997.

Early life
Gerard was born on 20 October 1936 in Canterbury. His father was the National MP Geoff Gerard. Gerard received his education at Christ's College and then became a sheep farmer in Cheviot. He held several roles with Federated Farmers.

Political career
Gerard served on the Oxford County Council for some time. He was the National Party chair of the Rangiora electorate for eight years.

Member of Parliament

He was first elected to Parliament in the 1984 election, replacing the retiring Derek Quigley in the Rangiora electorate. He remained MP for Rangiora until the 1996 election, when the electorate was abolished. Gerard was unsuccessful in his campaign for the new Waimakariri electorate, losing to former Labour Party leader Mike Moore. He remained in Parliament as a list MP.

In 1990, Gerard was elected Chairman of Committees. Until 1992, the Chairman of Committees was known as the Deputy Speaker only when presiding over the House. On 10 November 1992, the position of Deputy Speaker was made official under the Standing Orders, and the role of Chairman of Committees was discontinued, with Gerard becoming the first Deputy Speaker. He held that role until 13 December 1996.

In April 1997, he resigned from Parliament to become New Zealand's High Commissioner to Canada in Ottawa. This was the first resignation by a list MP since New Zealand adopted the mixed-member proportional electoral system. Gerard was replaced by the next candidate on National's party list, Annabel Young. In the 1999 New Year Honours, Gerard was appointed a Companion of the Queen's Service Order for public services.

Waimakariri District
Gerard was elected Mayor of Waimakariri in 2001. He was re-elected in 2004, but lost the mayoralty in 2007 to Ron Keating. In October 2010, he was elected councillor for Waimakariri and was again returned to that role in 2013. At the 2016 and 2019 local elections, Gerard did not contest a councillor position; instead, he contested and was elected to the Rangiora community board.

Notes

References

|-

1936 births
Living people
New Zealand National Party MPs
Mayors of places in Canterbury, New Zealand
New Zealand list MPs
High Commissioners of New Zealand to Canada
People educated at Christ's College, Christchurch
Companions of the Queen's Service Order
Local politicians in New Zealand
New Zealand MPs for South Island electorates
Members of the New Zealand House of Representatives